Derby Acres is a census-designated place (CDP) in Kern County, California, United States. The population was 322 at the 2010 census, down from 376 at the 2000 census. The town is on State Route 33 at the northern extremity of the Midway-Sunset Oil Field, about five miles southeast of McKittrick.

Geography

History
Derby Acres was founded in the 1930s.

Demographics

2010
At the 2010 census Derby Acres had a population of 322. The racial makeup of Derby Acres was 289 (89.8%) White, 0 (0.0%) African American, 1 (0.3%) Native American, 0 (0.0%) Asian, 0 (0.0%) Pacific Islander, 23 (7.1%) from other races, and 9 (2.8%) from two or more races. Hispanic or Latino of any race were 36 people (11.2%).

The whole population lived in households, no one lived in non-institutionalized group quarters and no one was institutionalized.

There were 123 households, 35 (28.5%) had children under the age of 18 living in them, 66 (53.7%) were opposite-sex married couples living together, 10 (8.1%) had a female householder with no husband present, 8 (6.5%) had a male householder with no wife present.  There were 8 (6.5%) unmarried opposite-sex partnerships, and 1 (0.8%) same-sex married couples or partnerships. 29 households (23.6%) were one person and 15 (12.2%) had someone living alone who was 65 or older. The average household size was 2.62.  There were 84 families (68.3% of households); the average family size was 3.10.

The age distribution was 63 people (19.6%) under the age of 18, 40 people (12.4%) aged 18 to 24, 73 people (22.7%) aged 25 to 44, 99 people (30.7%) aged 45 to 64, and 47 people (14.6%) who were 65 or older.  The median age was 41.5 years. For every 100 females, there were 92.8 males.  For every 100 females age 18 and over, there were 100.8 males.

There were 144 housing units at an average density of 40.2 per square mile, of the occupied units 98 (79.7%) were owner-occupied and 25 (20.3%) were rented. The homeowner vacancy rate was 6.7%; the rental vacancy rate was 19.4%.  249 people (77.3% of the population) lived in owner-occupied housing units and 73 people (22.7%) lived in rental housing units.

2000
At the 2000 census there were 376 people, 125 households, and 101 families living in the CDP. The racial makeup of the CDP was 93.09% White, 1.06% Native American, 0.53% Pacific Islander, 4.52% from other races, and 0.80% from two or more races.  7.71% of the population were Hispanic or Latino of any race.
Of the 125 households 36.0% had children under the age of 18 living with them, 66.4% were married couples living together, 8.0% had a female householder with no husband present, and 19.2% were non-families. 12.8% of households were one person and 5.6% were one person aged 65 or older.  The average household size was 3.01 and the average family size was 3.24.

The age distribution was 30.1% under the age of 18, 6.9% from 18 to 24, 24.5% from 25 to 44, 26.9% from 45 to 64, and 11.7% 65 or older.  The median age was 36 years. For every 100 females, there were 100.0 males.  For every 100 females age 18 and over, there were 102.3 males.

The median household income was $44,688 and the median family income  was $50,179. Males had a median income of $45,521 versus $22,917 for females. The per capita income for the CDP was $19,925.  About 15.3% of families and 14.6% of the population were below the poverty line, including 18.6% of those under age 18 and 20.5% of those age 65 or over.

References

Census-designated places in Kern County, California
Populated places established in the 1930s
Census-designated places in California